was a feudal domain under the Tokugawa shogunate of Edo period Japan, located in Tajima Province in what is now the northern portion of modern-day Hyōgo Prefecture. It was centered initially around Toyooka Castle, and later at Toyooka jin'ya, which were located in what is now the city of Toyooka, Hyōgo.

History
From the Muromachi period, Tajima Province had been under the control of the Yamana clan. However, in the Sengoku period, the area was conquered by Oda Nobunaga.  Following the Battle of Sekigahara, Tokugawa Ieyasu created Toyooka Domain as a fief for Sugihara Nagafusa. Sugihara had fought on the Western (losing) side, but he was married to a daughter of Asano Nagamasa, so he escaped any punishment, but was instead rewarded with a 20,000 koku holding. In 1611, he even managed to expand his holdings to 25,000 koku with additional estates in Hitachi Province. However, in 1644 his son Sugihara Shigenaga died without an heir.  A nephew, Sugihara Shigeharu was posthumously adopted, and the Tokugawa shogunate decided to accept this arrangement, albeit by reducing the domain to 10,000 koku. Unfortunately for the Sugihara clan, Sugihara Shigeharu died in 1645 at the age of 17 without an heir, and this time the shogunate abolished the domain through attainder. 

In 1668, the shogunate transferred a cadet branch of the Kyōgoku clan from Tango-Tanabe Domain to Toyooka. Kyōgoku Takamori maintained the same kokudaka of 35,000 koku;  however, the transfer was in effect a demotion, as previous he had held Tanabe Castle, whereas in his new holding he was not permitted to reoccupy Toyooka Castle, but to construct a much smaller jin'ya. Strapped for cash, he even had to borrow 4000 ryō from the shogunate for its construction. In 1726, the fourth daimyō, Kyōgoku Takanori died at the age of ten, and the domain was in danger of attainder. His six year old younger brother, Kyōgoku Takanaga was appointed daimyō, but the shogunate reduced the domain to 15,000 koku. This created severe financial hardship, and the domain was forced to fire many of its retainers and to reduce the stipends of its remaining samurai. In 1727, the domain's Edo residence durned down. Takanaga appointed Kuramochi Sazen to rebuild the domain's financial affairs; however, these reforms enraged the most conservative retainers, including the karō [Ishizuka Tsuneyoshi, who left the domain in protest. This feud between the reformers and the conservatives were persist for the next several generations. The 7thdaimyō, Kyōgoku Takaari constructed a trading hall to regulate commerce of many products which had been proclaimed domain monopolies. It was burned down two years later by enraged merchants supported by the conservative faction in 1823. In 1833, the 8th daimyō, Kyōgoku Takayuki constructed a han school. During the Bakumatsu period, the 9th daimyō, Kyōgoku Takamatsu was ordered by the shogunate to construct an artillery battery for coastal defense in 1862. The domain sat out the Boshin War without incident. In 1871, with the abolition of the han system, Toyooka Domain became "Toyooka Prefecture". and subsequently became part of Hyogo Prefecture.  The Kyōgoku clan was later ennobled with the kazoku peerage title of shishaku (viscount).

Holdings at the end of the Edo period
Unlike most domains in the han system, which consisted of several discontinuous territories calculated to provide the assigned kokudaka, based on periodic cadastral surveys and projected agricultural yields, Toyooka Domain was a single unified holding. 

Tajima Province 
28 villages in Kinosaki District
28 villages in Futakata District

List of daimyō 

{| class=wikitable
! #||Name || Tenure || Courtesy title || Court Rank || kokudaka 
|-
|colspan=6|  Sugihara clan, 1600-1653 (Tozama)
|-
||1||||1600 - 1620||Hoki-no-kami (伯耆守)|| Junior 5th Rank, Lower Grade (従五位下)||20,000 -> 25,000 koku
|-
||2||||1620 - 1644||Hoki-no-kami (伯耆守)|| Junior 5th Rank, Lower Grade (従五位下)||25,000 koku
|-
||3||||1645 - 1653|| -none- || -none- ||25,000 -> 10,000 koku
|-
|colspan=6|  tenryō　1653-1668
|-
|colspan=6|  Kyōgoku clan, 1668-1871 (Tozama)
|-
||1||||1668 - 1674||Ise-no-kami (伊勢守)|| Junior 5th Rank, Lower Grade (従五位下)||35,000 koku
|-
||2||||1674 - 1714||Kai-no-kami (甲斐守)|| Junior 5th Rank, Lower Grade (従五位下)||35,000 koku
|-
||3||||1714 - 1721||Kaga-no-kami (加賀守)|| Junior 5th Rank, Lower Grade (従五位下)||35,000 koku
|-
||4||||1721 - 1726|| -none- || -none- ||35,000 koku
|-
||5||||1726 - 1760||Kai-no-kami (甲斐守)|| Junior 5th Rank, Lower Grade (従五位下)||35,000 -> 20,000 koku
|-
||6||||1760 - 1791||Kai-no-kami (甲斐守)|| Junior 5th Rank, Lower Grade (従五位下)||20,000 koku
|-
|7||||1791 - 1831||Hida-no-kami (飛騨守)|| Junior 5th Rank, Lower Grade (従五位下)||20,000 koku
|-
||8||||1831 - 1847||Kai-no-kami (甲斐守)|| Junior 5th Rank, Lower Grade (従五位下)||20,000 koku
|-
||9||||1847 - 1871||Hida-no-kami (飛騨守)|| Junior 5th Rank, Lower Grade (従五位下)||20,000 koku
|-
|}

See also 
 List of Han
 Abolition of the han system

Further reading
 Bolitho, Harold. (1974). Treasures Among Men: The Fudai Daimyo in Tokugawa Japan. New Haven: Yale University Press.  ;  OCLC 185685588

References

Domains of Japan
1600 establishments in Japan
States and territories established in 1600
1871 disestablishments in Japan
States and territories disestablished in 1871
Tajima Province
Domains of Hyōgo Prefecture